Keijo may refer to:

Keijō, a former name of Seoul, South Korea
Keijo (given name), a Finnish given name
Keijo!!!!!!!!, a Japanese manga series